Buknu is a powdered mixture of several spices popular in parts of Uttar Pradesh, India.

Buknu is a very ancient recipe and is claimed to have medicinal values. It is used as both a spice and a condiment. Buknu's main ingredients include amchoor, salt, turmeric, cumin seeds, asafoetida, black cumin, black cardamom, and oil.

The recipe for Buknu likely originated in the [Kanpur city] of Uttar Pradesh.

See also
Indian cuisine
List of Indian spices

References 

Herb and spice mixtures